Tombaugh Regio is the largest bright surface feature of the dwarf planet Pluto. It is just north of the equator, to the northeast of Cthulhu Macula and to the northwest of Krun Macula, which are both dark features. Its western lobe, a -wide plain of nitrogen and other ices lying within a basin, is named Sputnik Planitia. The eastern lobe consists of high-albedo uplands thought to be coated by nitrogen transported through the atmosphere from Sputnik Planitia, and then deposited as ice. Some of this nitrogen ice then returns to Sputnik Planitia via glacial flow. Named after Clyde Tombaugh, the discoverer of Pluto, it was nicknamed Pluto's "heart" after its shape.

Description
The two lobes of the feature are geologically distinct. The western lobe, Sputnik Planitia, is smoother than the eastern, and they are of slightly different colors. Early speculation was that the western lobe may be a large impact crater filled with nitrogen snow. Bright spots within the region were initially speculated to be mountain peaks. Photos, released on 15 July 2015, revealed  mountains made of water ice in the feature; they also showed no craters in this same region. Subsequent data indicated that the center of Sputnik Planitia is rich in nitrogen, carbon monoxide, and methane ices, and that features near the edges of the region show evidence of ice flow such as glaciers, and light material overlying the darker material at the eastern edge of Cthulhu Macula. The surface of Sputnik Planitia is divided into polygonal convection cells and is less than 10 million years old, indicating that Pluto is geologically active.

The feature had been identified as a bright spot for six decades prior to the New Horizons flyby, although it was impossible to image it with enough resolution to determine its shape. Over these six decades the spot had been observed to be dimming.

In 2020, it was found that Tombaugh Regio controlled the wind circulation of Pluto, and could sculpt the landscape on its surface.

Naming and shape 
On 15 July 2015, the region was provisionally named "Tombaugh Regio" by the New Horizons team in honor of astronomer Clyde Tombaugh, the discoverer of Pluto, regio being Latin for "region". On 7 September 2017, the name was officially approved by the International Astronomical Union (IAU), together with names for 13 other surface features on Pluto.

NASA initially referred to the region as a "heart" in reference to its overall shape. Some people find that it also resembles the Disney character Pluto, an animated non-anthropomorphic dog which shares the name of the dwarf planet, in profile facing eastward. The Walt Disney Company acknowledged this perceived likeness in a short animation.

Gallery

See also 

 Geography of Pluto
 List of geological features on Pluto

References
 

Regions of Pluto